A  is a small traditional handmade that originated from the Edo period in Japan, made from white paper or cloth, Japanese farmers began hanging outside of their window by a string. This talisman is supposed to have magical powers to bring good weather and to stop or prevent a rainy day. Teru is a Japanese verb that describes sunshine, and a bōzu is a Buddhist monk (compare the word bonze), or in modern slang, "bald-headed"; bōzu is also used as a term of endearment for addressing little boys.

Teru Teru bōzu became popular during the Edo period among urban dwellers, whose children would make them the day before the good weather was desired and chant, "Fine-weather priest, please let the weather be good tomorrow."

Traditionally, if the weather does turn out well, a libation of holy sake is poured over them, and they are washed away in the river. Today, children make teru teru bōzu out of tissue paper or cotton and string and hang them from a window when they wish for sunny weather, often before a school picnic day. Hanging it upside-down acts as a prayer for rain. They are a very common superstition in Japan.

There is a famous warabe uta associated with teru teru bōzu, written by Kyoson Asahara and composed by Shinpei Nakayama, that was released in 1921.

Edō Period 

Tradition is well practiced and known in Japan, but many Japanese have doubts about the origin of the doll. Teru teru bōzo seems to have originated from the similarity between origami dolls and names described in the literature in the middle of the Edo period. A reference to teru teru bōzo is written in Kiyu Shoran(嬉遊笑覧) by Nobusetsu Kitamura, a scholar of Japanese classical literature in 1830. It is written, "If the weather becomes fine, I write my pupils on the paper, offer sake to the gods, and pour it into the river."

The tradition of weather-watchers and a rich folk culture of hiyorimi can be traced with certainty to the Heian period (749 – 1185) continuing through the Edo period (1603 to 1867). Teru teru bōzu weather-watching practice tradition originated and was adapted from a Chinese practice during the Heian period. The practice involved putting the teru teru bōzo on the end of a broom to sweep good spirits your way, and rather than bōzu being a monk, but a young girl with a broom. As the story unfolds, a girl was sacrificed to save the city during a heavy rainfall by ascending symbolically to the heavens and sweeping rain clouds from the sky. Since then, the people have commemorated her by making paper cutouts of herself and hanging them outdoors in the hopes of good weather.

See also 

Ikeda, Nagano – a town located in Nagano Prefecture, Japan. Mascot of this town is designed in the motif of Teru teru bōzu.

References

External links

 Tracking down the origins of the teru teru bozu (てるてる坊主) sunshine doll tradition
 What are Teruteru Bōzu?

Japanese folklore
Japanese dolls
Amulets
Talismans
Shinto
Buddhist religious objects
Religious objects
Shinto religious objects
Superstitions of Japan
Eastern esotericism
Japanese words and phrases